USNS Puerto Rico (T-EPF-11) is the eleventh  and currently in service with the United States Navys Military Sealift Command.

Puerto Rico was christened on 10 November 2018.

References

Transports of the United States Navy
Ships built in Mobile, Alabama
Spearhead-class Joint High Speed Vessels